Caltanissetta Cathedral is the cathedral of the Roman Catholic Diocese of Caltanissetta. It is located in Caltanissetta, Sicily, Italy.

Its construction began in 1570 and ended in 1622. Between 1718 and 1720 the Flemish painter Guglielmo Borremans, together with his son Luigi, frescoed the vault and the nave, and painted the greater altarpiece, depicting the Immaculate Conception.

See also
Catholic Church in Italy

References

External links 

 Catholic Hierarchy: Diocese of Caltanissetta 

Roman Catholic churches completed in 1622
Roman Catholic cathedrals in Italy
Cathedrals in Sicily
 
1622 establishments in Italy
17th-century Roman Catholic church buildings in Italy